Timothy James Leary (born December 23, 1958) is an American former professional baseball right-handed pitcher.

Amateur career
Leary posted a 10–2 record in his senior year at Santa Monica High School, and was named to the  All-California Interscholastic Federation first-team. He went 19–1 to lead his American Legion Baseball team to the national championship.  Much more in stature than his teammate and fellow former major leaguer, Rod Allen, he received the opportunity to play college baseball at UCLA.

Leary attended the University of California, Los Angeles (UCLA), where he was a three-year letterwinner for the UCLA Bruins baseball team while completing an economics degree. Over his college career, Leary compiled a 21–15 record with a 3.09 earned run average. His sixteen complete games is a school record, and his 258 strikeouts are the school's fourth highest total.

In , Leary helped lead the United States national baseball team to the silver medal in the World Cup played in Italy. He was also a member of the national team for the 1979 Pan American Games.

Professional career

New York Mets
Leary was selected by the New York Mets as the second overall pick of the 1979 Major League Baseball draft. He went 15–8 with a 2.76 ERA and 138 strikeouts for the Jackson Mets in his first professional season, prompting the Mets to make the controversial decision to bring him all the way to the majors for his second season. Making his major league debut on April 12, Leary faced just seven batters, before leaving the game after just two innings with a strained elbow. After four months inactive, he appeared in six games with the Mets' triple A affiliate, the Tidewater Tides toward the end of the 1981 season. He strained his elbow a second time during Spring training , and was shut down for the entire 1982 season.

Regardless, he received a second call up to the majors that September, and never made it out of the second inning in his return, mostly due to two errors by George Foster in left field that led to five unearned runs. His second start, however, went far better, as he pitched a complete game for his first major league victory against the Montreal Expos.

Leary split the  season between Tidewater and the Mets

Milwaukee Brewers
During the 1984-85 offseason, Leary was part of a four team trade in which the Mets sent him to the Milwaukee Brewers and received Frank Wills from the Kansas City Royals.

Leary spent the  season with Milwaukee's triple A affiliate, the Vancouver Canadians, and once again returned to the majors when rosters expanded that September. He finally enjoyed his first healthy major league season in  when he went 12–12 with a 4.21 ERA and 188.1 innings pitched. Following the season, he and Tim Crews were traded to the Los Angeles Dodgers for Greg Brock.

Los Angeles Dodgers
After the season, Leary pitched in the Mexican Leagues so he could learn how to throw a split-finger pitch. He had to drive from Santa Monica to Tijuana on a daily basis to play. He held the Philadelphia Phillies to just one hit on May 25, and was named the National League's "Pitcher of the Week" for the week of July 18–24, during which he shut out the St. Louis Cardinals and earned a complete game victory over the Pittsburgh Pirates. He finished the season second on his team behind Cy Young Award winner Orel Hershiser in wins (17), ERA (2.91), shutouts (6), complete games (9) and innings pitched (228.2), while leading his club with 180 strikeouts.

The Dodgers won the National League West by seven games over the Cincinnati Reds to face Leary's former franchise, the New York Mets, in the 1988 National League Championship Series. Leary appeared in the game four twelve inning marathon won by the Dodgers, and made the start in game six, taking the loss.

In the World Series against the Oakland Athletics, Leary was used out of the bullpen by manager Tommy Lasorda. His three innings of scoreless work allowed the Dodgers to come back from a 4–2 deficit in game one, and he appeared in game three, allowing one run in 3.2 innings.

Following the Dodgers' World Series victory, Leary was named the Sporting News' National League Comeback Player of the Year for his regular season performance.

Cincinnati Reds
He was traded to the Cincinnati Reds midway through the  season with Mariano Duncan for Kal Daniels and Lenny Harris. After the season, the Reds sent him and Van Snider to the New York Yankees for Hal Morris and minor leaguer Rodney Imes.

New York Yankees
Leary experienced some hard luck in his first season with the Yankees. Despite a respectable 4.11 ERA, he led the American League with nineteen losses, mostly due to poor run support from the Yankees' bats and a league leading 23 wild pitches. Either way, the Yankees re-signed Leary for three years and $5.95 million when he became a free agent at the end of the season. After winning his first two starts of the  season, Leary went 2–8 with a 6.95 ERA to earn a demotion to the bullpen. He ended the season at 4–10 with a 6.49 ERA.

Seattle Mariners
Seattle acquired Leary to fill a starting rotation that had been decimated by injury. As a result, Leary made six starts that September.

In , the Mariners improved from a team that narrowly avoided one hundred losses to 82–80, mostly due to new manager Lou Piniella, and the emergence of young stars Randy Johnson, Ken Griffey Jr. and Jay Buhner. For his part, Leary had his first winning season since 1988 at 11–9.

Retirement
He was 2–4 with a 5.43 ERA for the triple A Ottawa Lynx when they released him. He caught on with the Texas Rangers shortly afterwards, and went 1–1 with an 8.14 ERA. He retired when the Rangers attempted to reassign him to the minor leagues following the season.

In 2011, Leary served as the pitching coach at Cal State Northridge.

As of 2015, Leary is an Alumni member of the Los Angeles Dodgers Community Relations team.

Career stats

Leary was named the NL Silver Slugger pitcher in 1988, when he batted .269 with nine runs batted in and thirteen successful sacrifice bunts. His only career home run came off Hall of Famer Steve Carlton.

Personal life
Leary was inducted into the UCLA Bruins Athletics Hall of Fame while he was a member of the New York Yankees. He has also coached at Loyola Marymount University Now he is the pitching coach for Brentwood School in Los Angeles.

He resides in Pacific Palisades, Los Angeles. He has two daughters, Anne-Sophie and Caroline, and a son, Thomas.

References

External links
, or Ultimate Mets Database

1958 births
Living people
American expatriate baseball players in Canada
American people of Irish descent
Baseball players at the 1979 Pan American Games
Baseball coaches from California
Baseball players from Santa Monica, California
Cal State Northridge Matadors baseball coaches
Cincinnati Reds players
Jackson Mets players
Los Angeles Dodgers players
Major League Baseball pitchers
Milwaukee Brewers players
New York Mets players
New York Yankees players
Ottawa Lynx players
Pan American Games competitors for the United States
Seattle Mariners players
Silver Slugger Award winners
Texas Rangers players
Tiburones de La Guaira players
American expatriate baseball players in Venezuela
Tidewater Tides players
UCLA Bruins baseball players
University of California, Los Angeles alumni
Vancouver Canadians players
UCLA Bruins baseball coaches
Loyola Marymount Lions baseball coaches
High school baseball coaches in the United States
Alaska Goldpanners of Fairbanks players